The Abbottabad University of Science and Technology (AUST) is a public university located at Havelian ( from Abbottabad) in Khyber Pakhtunkhwa province of Pakistan. It offers undergraduate and postgraduate programs.

History 
AUST was started as the Havelian Campus of Hazara University in 2008 and got its own charter in 2015.
There are four faculties within the university, listed below. It is affiliated with the Higher Education Commission.

Faculties

Faculty of Health & Biomedical Sciences
 Department of Medical Lab Technology
 Department of Microbiology
 Department of Pharmacy

Faculty Of Humanities & Social Sciences
 Department of Economics
 Department of English
 Department of Management Sciences
 Department of Pakistan Studies
 Department Of Psychology

Faculty of Sciences
 Department of Chemistry
 Department Of Computer Science
 Department of Earth Sciences
 Department of Mathematics
 Department of Physics
 Department of Zoology

Faculty of Engineering and Technology
 Institute of Materials, Minerals and Mining Engineering

Affiliations
Following public and private colleges are affiliated with AUST:

Public Sector Colleges
 Government Girls Post Graduate College No: 1, Abbottabad
 Government Post Graduate College No.1 Abbottabad
 Government Post Graduate College Mandian, Abbottabad
 Government Girls Post Graduate College, Mandian, Abbottabad
 Government Girls Degree College Qalandarabad, Abbottabad
 Government Girls Degree College, Nawanshehr, Abbottabad
 Government College of Management Sciences, Abbottabad
 Government College of Commerce for Women, Officer Colony, Abbottabad
 Government Girls Degree College Neloar Saidan, Abbottabad
 Government Girls Degree College, Havelian, Abbottabad
 Government Degree College, Havelian, Abbottabad
 Government Home Economics College, Lambi, Dheri, Abbottabad
 Government Degree College Nathia gali, Abbottabad
 Government Degree College Sherwan, Abbottabad
 Government Girls Degree College Malikpura, Abbottabad
 Government Degree College Boi, Abbottabad
 Regional Institute of Teacher Education, Abbottabad

Private Sector Colleges
 Islamia Modern Degree college, Abbottabad
College of Legal & Ethical Studies, Abbottabad
 Muslim College of Commerce & Management Sciences, Abbottabad
 Quaid Degree College of Education, Abbottabad
 PINE HILLS Institute of Business & IT, Abbottabad
 Iqra Degree College Havelian
 Jinnah Degree College of Commerce, Havelian, Abbottabad
 Abbott College of Commerce & Management Sciences, Abbottabad
 Abbottabad Homeopathic Medical College

 Banat Degree College, Abbattabad
 Liaqat Institute of Management & Sciences, Abbottabad

See also
 University of Haripur

References

External links 
 AUST official website

Public universities and colleges in Khyber Pakhtunkhwa
Universities and colleges in Abbottabad
2008 establishments in Pakistan
Educational institutions established in 2008
Abbottabad District